Paleo-Balkans refers to:

 Prehistoric Balkans
 Paleo-Balkan languages
 Balkan sprachbund
 Paleo-Balkanic peoples
 Thracians
 Dacians
 Illyrians
 Ancient Greeks
 List of Aancient Greek tribes
 Paleo-Balkanic mythology

Language and nationality disambiguation pages